Wallace Community College (formally George C. Wallace State Community College) is a public community college in Dothan, Alabama.

Wallace Community College may also refer to:

Wallace Community College Selma (formally George Corley Wallace State Community College), in Selma, Alabama
Lurleen B. Wallace Community College, with campuses in several Alabama cities
Wallace State Community College, in Hanceville